Pachnephorus cristiani is a species of leaf beetle found in the Democratic Republic of the Congo, Angola, Namibia, Botswana, Zimbabwe and Mozambique, described by Stefano Zoia in 2007. It is dedicated to the author's son, Cristian.

References

Eumolpinae
Beetles of the Democratic Republic of the Congo
Insects of Angola
Insects of Namibia
Insects of Botswana
Insects of Zimbabwe
Insects of Mozambique
Beetles described in 2007